The 1991 Taça de Portugal Final was the final match of the 1990–91 Taça de Portugal, the 51st season of the Taça de Portugal, the premier Portuguese football cup competition organized by the Portuguese Football Federation (FPF). The match was played on 2 June 1991 at the Estádio Nacional in Oeiras, and opposed two Primeira Liga sides: Beira-Mar and Porto. Porto defeated Beira-Mar 3–1 in a game that went to extra-time, which would give Porto their seventh Taça de Portugal.

In Portugal, the final was televised live on RTP. As a result of Porto winning the Taça de Portugal, the Dragões qualified for the 1991 Supertaça Cândido de Oliveira where they took on 1990–91 Primeira Divisão winners Benfica.

Match

Details

References

1991
1990–91 in Portuguese football
FC Porto matches
S.C. Beira-Mar matches
June 1991 sports events in Europe